The Deserter is a 1912 American silent black-and-white two-reel Western film written and directed by Thomas H. Ince. It was released March 15, 1912 and starred Francis Ford and Ethel Grandin. The film was screened in December 2006 at the Museum of Modern Art in New York, as part of a retrospective on Thomas H. Ince. The film is available at the Library of Congress.

Plot
The story concerns a soldier who deserts his regiment and encounters a wagon train of settlers. When finding an attack by American Indians is eminent, he returns to his unit in order to elicit help.

Cast (in credits order)
 Francis Ford
 Ethel Grandin
 Harold Lockwood
 J. Barney Sherry
 Ray Myers
 Winnie Baldwin
 Clifford Smith

References

External links
 

1912 films
1912 Western (genre) films
American silent short films
American black-and-white films
Films about deserters
Silent American Western (genre) films
Films directed by Thomas H. Ince
1910s American films
1910s English-language films